Silat ad-Dhahr is a Palestinian town in the Jenin Governorate in the northern West Bank, located 22 kilometers southwest of Jenin. According to the Palestinian Central Bureau of Statistics (PCBS) census, the town had a population of 5,794 in 2007. The healthcare facilities for the surrounding villages are based in Silat adh Dhahr, the facilities are designated as MOH level 2.

The average elevation of the town is 400 meters above sea level. The population in 1997 was 4,439, according to the Palestinian Central Bureau of Statistics, the estimated population in 2001 was approximately 6,000 and was divided into 51% males and 49% female, young people representing a very high percentage of inhabitants. About 30% of inhabitants are traders and 20% rely on agriculture, producing such products as olives and almonds.

The village has a high level of education, and there is a large group of university graduates. There are water and electricity networks in the town, there are also telephone and Internet lines. There is also a health clinic and sports, social and cultural centers and libraries. There are five schools in the town: the Industrial School (co-ed, 150 students), a secondary school for boys (450 students), primary school for boys (500 students), a secondary school for girls (400 students), and a primary school for girls (650 students).

Geography
Silat ad-Dhahr is situated in a deep ravine at the edge of a ridge with an average elevation of 370 meters above sea level. It is surrounded by the hills of the Musheirif Range. The old core of the village is situated on a spur and has an area of 28 dunams. The village is located 23 kilometers southwest of Jenin in the northern West Bank. The nearest localities are Fandaqumiya and Jaba' to the east, Burqa to the south, Bizzariya to the southwest, al-Attara to the west, Rama to the northwest, Ajjah to the north and Anzah to the northeast.

History
In 1949, a burial cave from the Roman and Byzantine periods was excavated in Silat ad-Dhahr by the American School of Oriental Research and McCormick Theological Seminary. The cave, located at the village's western edge, had three chambers, each with ten kokhim, and contained a variety of findings. It is thought that the oil lamps discovered at the site are of Samaritan origin.
A site on the ridge above Silat ad-Dhahr and with the same name contains Byzantine-era pottery sherds, mosaic fragments and a wine press. 

Pottery sherds from the town of Silat ad-Dhahr itself indicate that it was founded during the early Islamic period (9th–10th centuries CE). Arab chroniclers called it Silat ad-Dhahr to distinguish it from another homonymous Silat (Silet) northwest of Jenin.

Medieval period 
The Crusaders conquered the area in 1099 and referred to the village as "Sileta". King Baldwin IV of the Kingdom of Jerusalem confirmed the sale in 1178 of the village made by the viscount of Nablus (vicecomes Neapolitanus) to the Knights Hospitaller. The transaction included 103 "Bedouin tents", meaning homes, indicating that the tribal lands of the latter were in the vicinity of Silat ad-Dhahr. The total price paid was 5,500 bezants, of which 2,000 were for the village itself.

The village was mentioned by geographer Yaqut al-Hamawi in his Mu'jam al-Buldan, written in the early 13th century, during Ayyubid rule.

Ottoman era
Silat ad-Dhahr was incorporated into the Ottoman Empire with the rest of Palestine in 1517. In the 1596 Ottoman tax records, it appeared under the name of Sila, located in the Nahiya Jabal Sami, in the Nablus Sanjak. It had a population of 27 households and 9 bachelors, all Muslim. The villagers paid a fixed tax-rate of 33.3% on agricultural products, including wheat, barley, summer crops, olive trees, goats and beehives, in addition to occasional revenues and a press for olives or grapes; a total of 7,400  akçe. Nearby Neby Lawin  at the same time had 21 families and 6 bachelors, also all Muslims.

Silat ad-Dhahr was mentioned by the Turkish traveler Evliya Celebi in 1640. In the spring of 1697, Henry Maundrell, on his way to Jerusalem, noted there "a fair Fountain, called Selee, taking its name from an adjacent village." Most of the buildings in Silat ad-Dhahr's old town date back to the 17th and 18th centuries.

The village's main mosque was built in the 19th century. It has a particularly tall minaret. Robinson  missed it in his travels in the region in 1838, but notes that Henry Maundrell had passed it during his travels. Robinson placed  it in the  esh-Sha'rawiyeh esh-Shurkiyeh, the eastern administrative region, north of Nablus.

In 1870 Victor Guérin  visited, and described it as “a large village divided into quarters, with 1800 inhabitants. It occupies a hill surrounded by higher hills in the north, with beautiful olive trees on their slopes. A good fountain supply the village.”

In 1882, the PEF's Survey of Western Palestine described Silat ad-Dhahr as:"a good-sized and flourishing village, built on a hill slope, with many good stone houses. It is surrounded by fine groves of olives, and owns good lands in the plain. The principal water supply is from a good spring of clear water, which appears to be perennial. This comes out of the chalk rock on the slope of the hill by the main road above the village on the north-cast. It is called 'Ain Sileh, and is half-a-mile from the houses. The name of the sacred place opposite the village on the north is of special interest : Neby Lawin, signifying the Levite Prophet."

During the end of this era, under the leadership of  the German engineer Heinrich August Meißner (Meisner Pasha),  156 kilometres of railway were built between  Silat ad-Dhahr  and Beersheba, during just a six-month period.

British Mandate period

Palestine, including Silat ad-Dhahr, was captured by British forces during World War I and the country subsequently came under a British Mandate. In the 1922 census of Palestine, conducted by the British Mandate authorities, Silat ad-Dhahr had a population of 1,638, mostly Muslims with three Christians, all Orthodox.  The population increased in the 1931 census to 1,985 inhabitants, all Muslims, living in 466 houses.

Silat ad-Dhahr was home to Abu Khalid, a disciple of Izz ad-Din al-Qassam and rebel commander during the 1936–1939 Palestine revolt against the British authorities.

In  1945 statistics, the population of Silat eh Dahr was 2,850, all Muslims,  with 9,972 dunams of land, according to an official land and population survey. 1,978 dunams were used for plantations and irrigable land, 4,577 dunams for cereals,  while 64 dunams were built-up (urban) land and 3,179 dunams were classified as "non-cultivable".

Jordanian era
In the wake of the 1948 Arab–Israeli War, and after the 1949 Armistice Agreements, Silat ad-Dahr came under Jordanian rule.

In 1961, the population of Silat Dhahr was 3,566 persons.

1967, aftermath
Silat ad-Dhahr has been under Israeli occupation since the 1967 Six-Day War. Israeli military took over several houses in the town in 2004. In 2005, 18 people from Silat ad-Dhahr were killed by Al-Qaeda terrorists in the Amman bombings.

In 2008, Israeli settlers harassed villagers and closed off the main road.

Demographics
Silat ad-Dhahr had a population of 4,639 in the 1997 census by the Palestinian Central Bureau of Statistics (PCBS). Palestinian refugees and their descendants accounted for 11.7% of the inhabitants. In the 2007 PCBS census, Silat ad-Dhahr's population grew to 5,794. The number of households was 946, with each household containing an average of between six members. Women made up 49.3% of the population and men 50.7%.

Neby Lawin
Just north of Silat ad-Dhahr is Neby Lawin, known in Crusader sources as Loie or Loja, while considered the burial place of Levi in the late 19th century.

Aaron Demsky identified Silat ad-Dhahr with Shilta, mentioned in the Mosaic of Rehob from the 6th-7th centuries as a village in the region of Sebastia. The agricultural produce of Shilta was exempt from the normal Jewish restrictions imposed during the Sabbatical years, or the need for tithing, possibly because it was inhabited by Samaritans or Gentiles or both. It is mentioned next to Penṭāḳūmewatha, identified with the nearby village of Fandaqumiya.

Ze'ev Safrai also associated Silat adh-Dhahar with Shilta, attributing the identification to Zussman. He wrote that the village was only known as Sila during the 17th century, indicating that the suffix "adh-Dhahar" was added later. The name Sila is mentioned as a Samaritan center in a Samaritan chronicle. According to Safrai, the Samaritan community later became a Gentile community.

In the absence of any suitable finds, Zertal suggested Shilta should be located at the nearby site of Neby Lawin, whereas, he believes, the name survived in the later founded Silet adh-Dhahr.

References

Bibliography

External links
  Welcome To Silat al-Dhahr
 Silat az-Zahr, Welcome to Palestine
Survey of Western Palestine, Map 11: IAA, Wikimedia commons 

Jenin Governorate
Villages in the West Bank
Municipalities of the State of Palestine
Ancient Samaritan settlements